Kidbrooke is an area of South East London, England, in the Royal Borough of Greenwich  south-east of Charing Cross and north west of Eltham.

The district takes its name from the Kyd Brook, a watercourse which runs from Orpington to Lewisham, by which point it is part of the River Quaggy. It is a tributary to the River Ravensbourne.

Housing

The area contains a large amount of 1920s and 1930s domestic housing, developed partly as the Kidbrooke Park Estate, between Shooters Hill and Rochester Way.

A large RAF stores base, RAF Kidbrooke, formerly occupied much of the land around Kidbrooke railway station, north and south of the railway line.  In 1965 the Government released most of the land to the Greater London Council for housing. The Ferrier Estate, built from 1968, was conceived to be a flagship scheme but became one of the largest and most deprived council housing developments in London. 

The housing estate was demolished in 2012 and has been redeveloped as Kidbrooke Village, a development of 4,200 homes masterplanned by Lifschutz Davidson Sandilands with Design and Build MEP contractor Cilantro Engineering.

Features

Immediately south of the former Ferrier Estate is Sutcliffe Park which includes a lake, acting as a flood defence, and created by partly releasing the Kyd Brook from concrete conduits underground in which it had run until 2006.

Rochester Way, a road which was built along much of the course of the old country lane Kidbrooke Lane, was intended as a bypass for Shooters Hill to the north. Rochester Way has itself now been bypassed by a dual carriageway – part of the A2 road – built in the 1980s over most of Kidbrooke Green. A small remaining piece of this open land, alongside the road, is now Kidbrooke Green Park, and adjacent to that, a small nature reserve managed by Greenwich Council. The nature reserve is visible, but not open to the public.

Little sign of the former RAF base remains.  A handful of buildings survive, south of the houses of Nelson Mandela Road, to the north of the railway line, that escaped demolition when the Rochester Way Relief Road dual carriageway was constructed. These are currently used for additional collection storage by the National Maritime Museum, with some now removed to make way for a new purpose-built conservation facility, the Prince Philip Maritime Collections Centre, which opened in 2019.

To the west of this Thomas Tallis School is built on another part of the former base, the former site of a prisoner-of-war camp, barrage balloon centre, and then a military language-teaching facility. (There are several other military facilities in the general vicinity, which is also close to a surviving base in Woolwich, long home to the Royal Artillery and now to other parts of the British Army.)

Transport

Rail
Kidbrooke railway station provides the area with Southeastern services to London Victoria, London Charing Cross, London Cannon Street, Dartford and Slade Green.

Buses
Kidbrooke is served by London Buses routes 132, 178, 286, 335, 386 and B16. These connect it with areas including Bexleyheath, Blackheath, Eltham, Greenwich, Lewisham, North Greenwich, Sidcup, Welling and Woolwich.

Roads
The A2 road gives the area rapid access to the London Inner Ring Road, the South Circular Road and the M25 motorway.

Education

Primary schools
 Wingfield School
 Kidbrooke Park
 Holy Family R.C
 Henwick Primary School
 Ealdham Primary School

Secondary schools
 The Halley Academy — opened in 1954 as Kidbrooke School; the first purpose-built comprehensive school in Britain and became an Academy in 2011 as Corelli College
 Thomas Tallis School — opened in 1971

Notable inhabitants

Famous residents have included comedian Jim Davidson, who grew up in Holburne Road; interior designer Lawrence Llewelyn Bowen, who lived in a bungalow on Kidbrooke Park Road until 2004; and singer Sandie Shaw. AFC Bournemouth player Junior Stanislas was born in Kidbrooke. Ryan Stanton currently lives in Kidbrooke.

See also

 List of people from Greenwich
 List of schools in Greenwich

Roads
 County of London Plan
 London Ringways
 East Cross Route

Nearby areas

References

External links

 Kidbrooke Village masterplan
 Kidbrooke Village Phase 1
 Kidbrooke Village Phase 3
 The Kidbrooke Kite – News and blog site covering Kidbrooke and surrounding area

Districts of the Royal Borough of Greenwich
Areas of London
Districts of London on the River Thames
Former civil parishes in the Royal Borough of Greenwich